Brouilletts Creek Township is one of fifteen townships in Edgar County, Illinois, USA.  As of the 2010 census, its population was 235 and it contained 114 housing units.

Geography

Extinct towns
 Kidley
 Logan

Cemeteries
The township contains these twelve cemeteries: Adams, Allen, Cameron, Houseton, Igo, Littlefield, McCauley, Mount Carmel, Newcomb, Newton, Old Scott and Sugar Grove.

Demographics

School districts
 Edgar County Community Unit District 6
 Paris Community Unit School District 4

Political districts
 Illinois' 15th congressional district
 State House District 109
 State Senate District 55

References
 
 United States Census Bureau 2007 TIGER/Line Shapefiles
 United States National Atlas

External links
 City-Data.com
 Illinois State Archives

Townships in Edgar County, Illinois
Townships in Illinois